A sugarloaf is refined sugar in the form of a rounded cone, the most common way of distributing sugar until the late 19th century.

Sugarloaf or Sugar Loaf may also refer to:

Geographic features
 Sugarloaf Mountain, the famous landmark in Rio de Janeiro, Brazil
 Sugarloaf (mountain), a list of other mountains with the same name
 Sugar Loaf (Winona, Minnesota), a bluff on the Mississippi River in Winona, Minnesota
 Sugar Loaf Island (California), the westernmost island in California in Humboldt County
 Sugarloaf Island, California,  one of the Farallon Islands offshore of San Francisco, California
 Sugarloaf Rock (Curtis Group), in Bass Strait off the north-east coast of Tasmania
 Sugarloaf Rock (Mutton Bird Group), off the south-west coast of Tasmania
 Sugarloaf Rock, Western Australia, near Cape Naturaliste Lighthouse, Western Australia

Communities
 Sugarloaf, California, USA
 Sugar Loaf, New York, USA
 Sugar Loaf, a community in Port Colborne, Ontario, Canada
 Sugarloaf Township (disambiguation), several townships in the USA
 Sugarloaf Key, Florida, USA

Other uses
 Sugarloaf Parkway, Gwinnett County, Georgia, USA
 Sugarloaf (ski resort), Maine, USA
 Sugar Loaf Dam, near Leadville, Colorado
 Sugar Loaf railway station, Wales
 Te Heru o Kahukura / Sugarloaf, New Zealand
 Sugarloaf Reservoir, located north-east of Melbourne, Victoria, Australia
 Sugarloaf (band), an American rock band
 Sugarloaf (album), the band's debut album
 Sugarloaf chicory, a cultivated type of chicory
 Sugarloaf helm, a type of great helm

See also 
 
 
 Sugarloaf Ridge State Park, California
 Sugarloaf Mountain Park, California, USA
 Sugarloaf Saw Mill, California, USA
 Sugarloaf Village, California, USA
 Pan de Azúcar (disambiguation) (Spanish equivalent)
 Sakharnaya Golova Island "Sugarloaf Island" in the Sea of Okhotsk